The West London line is a short railway in inner West London that links  in the south to Willesden Junction in the north. The line has always been an important cross-London link especially for freight services. Southern and London Overground provide regular passenger services; detailed below.

History

Origins
The Birmingham, Bristol & Thames Junction Railway was authorised in 1836 to run from the London and Birmingham Railway (L&BR), near the present Willesden Junction station, across the proposed route of the Great Western (GWR) on the level, to the Kensington Canal Basin. For about twelve years, the railway ran alongside the Kensington Canal, formerly Counter's Creek, a minor tributary of the Thames River until it was filled in, the water course turned into a sewer and the future District line built over it. Construction was delayed by engineering and financial problems. Renamed the West London Railway (WLR) the line officially opened on 27 May 1844, and regular services began on 10 June, but before that trials to demonstrate the potential of the atmospheric railway system had been held from 1840 to 1843 on a half-mile section of track adjacent to Wormwood Scrubs, leased to that system's promoters; The WLR used conventional power but was not a commercial success. After only six months it closed on 30 November 1844.

An Act of 1845 authorised the GWR and the L&BR (which became part of the London and North Western Railway [LNWR] in 1846) to take a joint lease of the WLR. The line was used only to carry coal, and passenger service was not re-introduced. The lack of success of the line became such a regular target of Punch magazine that the line was called Punch's Railway.

An Act in 1859 granted those two companies, with the London, Brighton and South Coast Railway (LB&SCR) and the London and South Western Railway (L&SWR), powers to construct the West London Extension Joint Railway on the filled-in canal south from the Kensington Basin to the bridge under the Kings Road, to bridge the Thames and to connect near Clapham Junction to railways south of the river. The existing line was doubled, and the flat crossing of the GWR main line, where a number of collisions had occurred, was replaced by a flyover. The new line opened on 2 March 1863 with a passenger station at Addison Road (now Kensington (Olympia)) slightly north of the original Kensington station, and was then well used by various inner London services for the remainder of the nineteenth century.

Operations to 1940
The branch was eventually closed and the link between the West London line and today's Hammersmith & City line was dismantled in 1930.

A branch was installed to allow trains from the former Southern Railway to access to the West Coast Main Line and vice versa: in summer the London Midland and Scottish Railway ran from as far north as Glasgow to the South Coast. Through trains in the steam era changed locomotives here. From the 1920s there was a United Dairies depot on the site of a former dairy farm here, which up until the late 1970s had regular milk train deliveries.

The northern section of the line, from Willesden Junction to Kensington Olympia and on to Earls Court, was electrified by the LNWR in 1915.

Decline after World War II
After a period of popularity, passenger usage dwindled on the West London Railway. Competition from the new deep-level Underground railways and electric tramways took away custom by offering more direct routes into Central London. With the onset of World War II, the West London line was badly hit in some parts by enemy action during the Blitz and the demise of the line was hastened by wartime bombing.

In 1948, the line became part of British Rail, following the nationalisation of the railways, but remained mostly in use as a freight route. For many years, limited passenger trains ran on workday mornings and evenings, to carry workers at the Post Office Savings Bank headquarters, Blythe House, near Olympia from Clapham Junction and back again, but these services were not publicly advertised.

Kensington Olympia was used as late as the 1970s as a location for collecting milk tanks (for the west country) from various terminals in the London area such as Ilford. This activity later transferred to Clapham Junction.

Reinstatement of passenger services
Since the 1940s the line has often been used for excursion and other special through trains across London to the South Coast. Between April 1963 and June 1965 the section between Willesden Jn and Kensington Olympia was used for trains diverted from Euston during the rebuilding of Euston station section. Kensington Olympia station was refurbished accordingly. During 1967 passenger services were diverted from Paddington between Old Oak Common and Kensington Olympia during engineering works at Paddington station.

In the late 1970s, the Greater London Council began to revitalise the North London Line, incorporating it onto the Tube Map in 1977 as a white line with black borders marked "British Rail" and electrifying the route from Dalston to Woolwich in 1985. The limited Clapham Junction - Kensington Olympia service appeared in the public timetables, but full passenger services on the West London line were not re-introduced until 1994 by Network SouthEast service. In 1997, as part of the privatisation of British Rail, operation of both the WLL and NLL was brought under the North London Railway franchise, and taken over by National Express, trading as Silverlink. For a decade, the West London line was operated with the green-and-purple liveried Silverlink Metro trains.

Channel Tunnel infrastructure work in 1993 electrified the line at 750 V DC third rail from the South to the North Pole depot. The line is electrified at 25 kV AC overhead wires from Westway (near the overbridge carrying the Hammersmith and City Line) to Willesden and the North. Until the High Speed 1 railway line from  opened in November 2007, Eurostar trains from  used the West London line to access their North Pole depot. 

The line was crucial to the planned Regional Eurostar service, and between 1995 and 1997 carried two daily services connecting the ECML and WCML respectively to Waterloo for international passengers. However the idea was cancelled.

Platforms were reinstated at West Brompton in 1999. In 2007, Transport for London took over the North London Railway franchise as the London Overground concession, introducing new rolling stock and rebranding the West London line trains and stations in orange livery. The line appears today on the Tube Map as an orange stripe.

Regional and InterCity services
In 1966 British Rail launched Motorail, a long-distance accompanied car train which transported passengers and their cars to the West of England and Scotland. The London Motorail  terminal was at Kensington (Olympia), using the West London line for its wide connections to the UK mainline rail network. Motorail ceased operations in 1981.

The CrossCountry franchise was taken over by Arriva CrossCountry and in 2008 the Brighton route was terminated.

In 2009, Southern introduced its cross-London service from Milton Keynes to East Croydon.

Train services

London Overground
The core operation of the West London line is the metro/commuter rail operated by London Overground. Four trains per hour run between Clapham Junction and Willesden Junction, with most trains continuing on the North London line to and from Stratford. It forms the western section of the Overground's orbital rail route which was completed in December 2012 when the East London line was extended to Clapham Junction via the South London line, linking it to the West London line .

Cross-London services
Along with the Thameslink and the East London line routes, the West London line presently forms part of the West London Route which is one of three National Rail routes which run across London instead of terminating in the central area. This regional rail service operated by Southern connects the West Coast Main Line in the north to the Brighton Main Line in the south. Southern services  pass through Willesden Junction without stopping as the mainline platforms were removed in 1962. However there are plans for these services to stop at Willesden Junction in the future which will mean building new main line platforms at Willesden Junction.

With engineering works on the upgrade of the West Coast Main Line, the service was shortened to terminate at Watford, and was discontinued, later revived as a shorter regional route as part of the South Central franchise in 2008.

Route 
From north to south, to line follows the following route with current and former stations, junctions with other railways and other features:

The West Cross Route, one side of the Ringway 1 inner ring road, would have paralleled the line.

Rolling stock
Trains in scheduled passenger services on the West London line are as follows:

Passenger volume

These are passenger volume statistics for the line from the years beginning April 2002 to April 2013. The large increases in the year beginning April 2006 were due to travelcards for National Rail journeys being made available from stations with London Underground ticket offices, and also using a different methodology to estimate likely journeys made from National Rail stations in Zone 1. The large increases in the year beginning April 2010 were due to increased train frequencies helped by the introduction of new rolling stock. Shepherd's Bush opened 2008 and Imperial Wharf the following year.

Future

A new station, Old Oak Common railway station, is planned at this site to provide an interchange between Crossrail, the GWML and High Speed 2. Due to the proximity of Willesden Junction, it has been suggested that an interchange could be added with the North London, Bakerloo, Watford DC and West London lines. A 2010 Department for Transport command paper highlights opportunities for interchanges at Old Oak Common with London Underground, London Overground and Southern's cross-London services, while a report prepared by Terry Farrell and Partners for the Borough of Hammersmith & Fulham proposes the construction of an overhead light rail, automated people mover or personal rapid transit system linking "Old Oak Central"  with Willesden Junction. However, no firm proposals exist to create an interchange with these lines.

Proposals for Old Oak Common being considered by Transport for London include a scheme to realign the routes of both the West London and North London lines around the Old Oak Common site to create a new London Overground interchange station. The proposal envisages diverting the NLL Richmond route to curve around the eastern side of Old Oak Common, and re-routing the WLL to branch west south of the Mitre Bridge before curving north along a short section of the Dudding Hill Line to join the West Coast Main Line. The NLL and WLL would meet at a point on the southern side of Old Oak Common, adjacent to Wormwood Scrubs, where new interchange platforms would be built. Alternative versions of this scheme also consider cheaper options such as terminating the WLL at Old Oak Common or two separate London Overground stations.

The West London line passes beneath the Earls Court Exhibition Centre along a complex intersection of track which crosses over the subsurface junction of three District line branches. The planned redevelopment of the site by Capital & Counties Properties envisages demolishing the Exhibition Centre to make way for retail and housing; as part of these plans, the West London line is to be enclosed by a concrete box. Commentators have noted that the proposals make no allowance for any future quadrupling of the track to increase capacity on the line.

References

Further reading 

.
 Thomas Faulkner (1839),  The History and Antiquities of the Parish of Hammersmith, pp 65–68.
 J.B. Atkinson "The West London Joint Railways" Ian Allan 1984.
 Vic Mitchell and Keith Smith "West London Line - Clapham Jn. to Willesden Jn." London Suburban Railways Series, Middleton Press 1996.

External links 

West London Line Group, representing the interests of users of the West London line.
West London Line from abandonedstations.org.uk
  Detailed pages on the history of each station on the line (current and disused).

London Overground
Transport in the London Borough of Wandsworth
Transport in the Royal Borough of Kensington and Chelsea
Transport in the London Borough of Hammersmith and Fulham
Transport in the London Borough of Brent
Railway lines in London
Railway lines opened in 1844
Standard gauge railways in London